The 1957–58 Israel State Cup (Gvia HaMedina) was the 20th season of Israel's nationwide football cup competition and the fifth after the Israeli Declaration of Independence.

Early round matches, with Liga Gimel and Liga Bet teams began on 12 October 1957. Liga Leumit clubs joined the competition in late June 1958.  a quarter-final match between Maccabi Tel Aviv and Hapoel Petah Tikva ended prematurely, and the IFA ruled the match in favor of Maccabi Tel Aviv. Hapoel Petah Tikva appealed the decision, and the process caused the semi-finals and the final to be delayed until the beginning of the 1958–59 season.

The final was held at the Ramat Gan Stadium on 30 September 1958. Maccabi Tel Aviv defeated Hapoel Haifa 2–0, won its 9th cup and completed its second double since the Israeli Declaration of Independence and third overall.

Following the conclusion of the competition, the IFA played an additional cup competition, dedicated to the 10th anniversary of Israel, which was played during October and November 1958.

Results

Third round
Matches were played on 29 March 1958, with the 28 winners qualifying to the 4th round.

Fourth round
The remaining 28 clubs played 14 matches to set the 14 clubs that will qualify to the sixth round.

Replays

Fifth round
The remaining 14 clubs played 7 matches to set the 7 clubs that will qualify to the sixth round.

Sixth round
12 Liga Leumit clubs joined the 16 winning teams from previous round to play 15 cup ties, with Hapoel Rehovot receiving a bye to the next round. Most matches were played on 21 June 1958, with the match between Maccabi Sha'arayim and Shimshon Tel Aviv being postponed to the next week.

Bye: Hapoel Rehovot

Seventh round

Replay

Quarter-finals

Semi-finals

Final

Notes

References
100 Years of Football 1906–2006, Elisha Shohat (Israel), 2006

External links
 Israel Football Association website

Israel State Cup
State Cup
State Cup
Israel State Cup seasons